Daryl Christopher Sabara (born June 14, 1992) is an American actor. He is known for portraying Juni Cortez in the Spy Kids film series and for a variety of television and film appearances, including The Polar Express, Wizards of Waverly Place, Father of the Pride, Keeping Up with the Steins, Halloween, Green Inferno, World's Greatest Dad, Grimm, America's Most Talented Kid (as a judge), and Weeds.

Early life
He graduated from West Torrance High School in 2010. He has a fraternal twin brother, Evan, who is also a voice actor. He is of Russian-Jewish descent from his mother and Polish descent from his father, and had a Bar Mitzvah ceremony. Sabara began performing with the regional ballet company, South Bay Ballet.

Career

Sabara began acting during the mid-1990s, appearing on episodes of Murphy Brown, Life's Work, Friends and Will and Grace before being cast as Juni Cortez in the Spy Kids series of family films, which became popular among pre-teen audiences.

Sabara provided the voice of Hunter in Father of the Pride. He has appeared in episodes of the television series Weeds, House, Dr. Vegas, and was one of the judges on America's Most Talented Kid. Sabara also voiced the main character, Hero Boy, in the 2004 animated version of The Polar Express. He then played a young Jewish boy trying to have a nice Bar Mitzvah in Keeping Up with the Steins (formerly known as Lucky 13), which received a limited release on May 12, 2006. He also guest starred in the Criminal Minds episode, "P911" where he played a sexually molested child. He also provided the voice for the titular character in Generator Rex.

He next appeared in the films Her Best Movie and the interactive DVD Choose Your Own Adventure, played Ben on The Last Chance Detectives radio dramas by Adventures in Odyssey and Focus on the Family, and also appeared as school bully Wesley Rhoades in Rob Zombie's Halloween. He then played Irwin in the theater play The Catskills Sonata, about a young Jewish busboy in the late 1950s.

In 2003, Sabara made a guest appearance as the character Owen on an episode of Friends, during which Matthew Perry's character Chandler accidentally reveals to Owen that he is adopted. He also gained a recurring role in the Disney Channel sitcom Wizards of Waverly Place as T.J. Taylor, a wizard who ignores the rules and uses magic the way he wants, often getting him into trouble. He was also in The Boondocks as the voice of Butch Magnus Milosevic in the episode "Shinin'". He appeared in two episodes of The Batman: first as Harris, a middle schooler; then as Scorn, the sidekick of the villain Wrath. Both roles were opposite his brother, who played "Robin".

He costarred in the 2009 film April Showers, a movie written and directed by a survivor of the 1999 Columbine High School massacre. He played Kyle, a misanthropic teenager in World's Greatest Dad, with Robin Williams, and Peter Cratchit in the 2009 film adaptation of A Christmas Carol. He appeared in the comedy series Easy To Assemble, where he played a character named George. In 2010, he appeared in the movie Machete, and the MTV movie Worst. Prom. Ever. which premiered May 10. In 2012, he co-starred in John Carter as Edgar Rice Burroughs.

He portrayed the recurring role of Tim Scottson in seven episodes (spanning from 2005 to 2012) of Weeds.

In 2014 he starred alongside Chloë Grace Moretz in the off-Broadway play The Library directed by Steven Soderbergh.

Personal life 
Sabara started dating singer-songwriter Meghan Trainor in July 2016. They became engaged on December 21, 2017, and married on December 22, 2018, Trainor's 25th birthday. On October 7, 2020, Trainor and Sabara announced they were expecting their first child together, a boy. On February 8, 2021, Trainor gave birth to their son. In January 2023, Trainor and Sabara announced they were expecting their second child together.

Filmography

Film

Television

Video games

References

External links

 

1992 births
Living people
20th-century American male actors
21st-century American male actors
Actors from Torrance, California
American male child actors
American male film actors
American people of Russian-Jewish descent
American people of Polish descent
American male television actors
American male voice actors
Jewish American male actors
American twins
21st-century American Jews